Jasper is a 2022 Indian Tamil-language drama film directed by Yuvaraj D, and starring Vivek Rajgopal, Aishwarya Dutta and Lavanya in the lead roles. It was released on 23 December 2022.

Cast
Vivek Rajgopal as Jasper
Aishwarya Dutta  as Seema
Lavanya as Vineesha
Raj Kalesh as Pastor Edward

Production
First Look of the film was released on 18 November 2022 By Siva Karthikeyan.

Soundtrack
The film's background score was composed by Kumaran, son of noted percussionist Drums Sivamani.

Reception
The film was released on 23 December 2022 across Tamil Nadu. A critic from Maalaimalar gave a mixture of review . A reviewer from Dina Thanthi noted that the director should have taken further care of his work. Critic Malini Mannath noted it was "a fairly interesting watch, Jasper could be an ideal fare for those satiated with the formulaic scenario and wish to view something different."

References

External links

2022 films
2020s Tamil-language films